Casabó is a neighbourhood of Montevideo, Uruguay.

Geography
The neighbourhood of Casabó is located in the southwestern part of Montevideo, between the districts of Santa Catalina to the west, Villa del Cerro to the east, Villa Esperanza to the north and the Río de la Plata to the south.

Casabó is the western extension of the Villa del Cerro and it includes the Fortaleza del Cerro, the Parque Dr. Carlos Vaz Ferreira and the ruins of the cold storage factory Frigorífico Swift, the shut down Frigorífico Nacional, the Club de Golf del Cerro and an area of the Navy. To the west of Casabó is the barrio of Santa Catalina, situated next to the beach and the public park of Punta Yeguas.

Places of worship
 Parish Church of St. Alberto Hurtado, Sierra Leona 144 (Roman Catholic)
 Parish Church of the Curé of Ars and St Helena, Av. Antártida Uruguaya 6100 (Roman Catholic)

References

See also 

Barrios of Montevideo

Barrios of Montevideo